Marysol Castro  is a public address announcer at Citi Field, home of the New York Mets.  She was also an American broadcast journalist who was employed as a news anchor at WPIX in New York, a weather forecaster for The Early Show on CBS in 2011, and a features correspondent for the weekend edition of Good Morning America on ABC from 2004 to 2010. In June 2015, Castro joined New Haven-based WTNH-TV to fill in for weekday morning traffic reports and anchor until mid-November 2015. In January 2019, Castro joined the booth of the Android and iOS app BallparkDJ making it possible for any youth softball or baseball team to be announced by her professional voice. Castro is the creator & host of Somos, a show that profiles Latinos of all walks of life.

Early life and career
Born on July 8, 1974, to Puerto Rican parents in New York City, Castro was raised in the Bronx and attended Public School 83 and Intermediate School 181. She was later admitted to the Oliver Scholars Program, an independent school access program for high-achieving students of color, and attended Westtown School, a Quaker boarding school in Pennsylvania and graduated from Wesleyan University in Middletown, Connecticut, with a Bachelor of Arts degree in 1996. She later obtained a Master of Arts in journalism  from the Columbia University Graduate School of Journalism.

Prior to her career with ABC News, Castro was a general assignment reporter for WPIX in New York. She worked as a reporter for News 12, a local cable news network in the Bronx. She taught briefly at Poly Prep Country Day School in Brooklyn as an English teacher. In September 2010, Castro left GMA Weekend. On January 3, 2011, as part of a complete show overhaul, Castro became the weekday weather forecaster for The Early Show on CBS replacing Dave Price. On September 2, 2011, it was announced that she would be leaving her post as weather anchor effective immediately.

In June 2015, Castro joined WTNH-TV ABC 8 in New Haven, Connecticut, to fill in as weekday morning traffic reporter and anchor. Castro was relieved of her fill-in duties in November 2015 and later left the station.

In July 2015, she joined ESPN as host of Premier Boxing Champions on ESPN.

Castro was named public address announcer at Citi Field, on May 30, 2018, replacing Alex Anthony.  She shares PA duties with Colin Cosell.  Castro's first game was May 31, 2018 against the Chicago Cubs.  Castro is the first female PA announcer in the Mets' history.

References

External links

American television reporters and correspondents
American women television journalists
Columbia University Graduate School of Journalism alumni
Living people
1974 births
Television meteorologists from New York (state)
Television meteorologists in New York City
New York (state) television reporters
Television anchors from New York City
People from the Bronx
American journalists of Puerto Rican descent
Weather presenters
Wesleyan University alumni
Hispanic and Latino American women journalists
Westtown School alumni
CBS News people
Major League Baseball public address announcers
Boxing commentators